Beaver, Kansas is an unincorporated community in Beaver Township of Barton County, Kansas, United States.  As of the 2020 census, the population of the community and nearby areas was 52.  It is located northeast of Hoisington at the intersection of NE 190 Rd and NE 60 Ave.

History
A post office was opened in Beaver in 1919, and remained in operation until it was discontinued in 1992.

Demographics

For statistical purposes, the United States Census Bureau has defined this community as a census-designated place (CDP).

Education
The community is served by Central Plains USD 112 public school district.

References

Further reading

External links
 Barton County maps: Current, Historic, KDOT

Unincorporated communities in Kansas
Unincorporated communities in Barton County, Kansas